The Citoyen was a 74-gun ship of the line of the French Navy, lead ship of her class to a design by Joseph-Louis Ollivier.  She was funded by a don des vaisseaux donation from the Bankers and General Treasurers of the Army.

Career 
Ordered in May 1757 as Cimeterre, the ship was renamed Citoyen on 20 January 1762. A launching attempt aborted on 10 August 1764, when she came to a halt on the ramp, and she was eventually set afloat 17 days later.

She took part in the He took part in the Battle of Martinique on 17 April 1780 under Captain Poute de Nieuil.

In 1781, under Alexandre de Thy, she was appointed to the squadron of Admiral de Grasse and took part in the Battle of Fort Royal in April. On 24 August, along with Glorieux, she captured HMS Cormorant off Charleston. In September, she took part in the Battle of the Chesapeake on 5 September 1781, in the Battle of St Kitts on 25/26 January 1782 and the Battle of the Saintes on 12 April 1782.

In 1783, on returning to France, she was decommissioned, and was eventually broken up in 1791.

Sources and references 
 Notes

Citations

References
 
 

External links
Naval Database 

Ships of the line of the French Navy
Citoyen-class ships of the line
1764 ships